ISO 3864 specifies international standards for safety signs and markings in workplaces and public facilities. These labels are graphical, to overcome language barriers. The standard is split into four parts.

Parts
ISO 3864 consists of four parts, that provide more specific and situation specific guidance depending on the application.
 ISO 3864-1:2011 Part 1: Design principles for safety signs and safety
 ISO 3864-2:2016 Part 2: Design principles for product safety labels
 ISO 3864-3:2012 Part 3: Design principles for graphical symbols for use in safety signs
 ISO 3864-4:2011 Part 4: Colorimetric and photometric properties of safety sign materials

Part 1 explains how to layout the components of safety signage, dictate the color scheme and sizing information. Part 2 covers the same concepts as part one, but specifically for labels applied on machinery, vehicles and consumer goods. Part 3 contains guidance for designing new safety symbols. Part 4 specifies the standards for phosphorescent material and colours of a sign, as well as testing to confirm these signs meets required standards.

Components of ISO 3864

Colours 
These are the colours specified in ISO Standard 3864-4 in RAL colour standard.

In addition, ISO standard 3864-2:2016 lays out the following colours that correspond to levels of risk.  This standard adds "Orange" as an incremental colour to the pallette above.

Arrows
ISO 3864-3 defines four types of arrow designs, and specifies what situations each type should be used in.

Safety markings
Part 1 also provides design standards for 'safety markings', which are safety colors combined with a contrasting color in an alternating 45° stripe pattern, intended to increase the visibility of an object, location or safety message.

Signage design
In addition to prescribing colours for safety signage, ISO 3864 also specifies how to layout the elements of the sign: A symbol and optional 'supplemental sign' which contains the supplementary text message.

Multi-message signs
For situations where more than one message needs to be communicated, ISO 3864 also provides guidance for "multiple signs", which consist of two or more symbol and text messages combined into a single sign. Additionally, fire protection and safe condition signs, which mark the location of equipment or exits can be combined with an arrow to indicate the direction to the item depicted on the sign.

Related standards
The corresponding American standard is ANSI Z535.  ANSI Z535.1 also explicitly uses multiple levels of hazard, including Yellow (Pantone 109) for 'caution' messages, and Orange (Pantone 151) for stronger 'warning' messages.    Like ISO 3864, ANSI Z535 includes multiple sections: ANSI Z535.6-2006 defines an optional accompanying text in one or more languages.

ISO 3864 is extended by ISO 7010, which provides a set of symbols based on the principles and properties specified in ISO 3864.

See also 
 ISO 7010 - Standard for safety symbols used in ISO 3864.
 ANSI Z535 - Corresponding American standard for safety signage, product warning labels and product instructions.

Notes

References 

03864